Trans Am is the debut album by Trans Am, released in 1996.

Artwork

The album's artwork was taken from the cover of a 10" flexi disc Space Sounds, which was part of Our Universe Space Kit, published by National Geographic Society in 1980.

Track listing
 Ballbados – 3:28
 Enforcer – 1:31
 Technology Corridor – 0:50
 Trans Am – 2:21
 (interlude) – 0:33
 Firepoker – 3:09
 A Single Ray of Light on an Otherwise Cloudy Day – 1:30
 Prowler – 1:43
 Orlando – 4:41
 Love Affair – 1:21
 American Kooter – 8:49

Japanese release extra tracks
 American Kooter
 Simulacrum
 Man-Machine
 Illegal Ass
 Koln
 Randy Groove
 Now You Die, Thriddle Fool
 Star Jammer
 Strong Sensations

References

1996 debut albums
Trans Am (band) albums
Thrill Jockey albums